The list of ship launches in 1913 includes a chronological list of ships launched in 1913.  In cases where no official launching ceremony was held, the date built or completed may be used instead.


References

Sources

1913
Launches
 Ship launches
Ship launches